Indian (Punjab and Rajasthan): Hindu (Arora, Bania, Khatri), Jain, and Sikh name, from Panjabi bəjāj or bəzāz ‘clothier’, from Arabic Bazzāz.

Notable people with this surname include:

Aarti Bajaj, Indian film editor
Ashok Bajaj, restaurateur based in Washington, DC
Jamnalal Bajaj (1884–1942), Indian businessman, founder of the Bajaj group of companies
Rahul Bajaj (born 1938), Indian businessman, grandson of Jamnalal Bajaj, chairman of Bajaj Auto, and MP of Rajya Sabha 
Janaki Devi Bajaj (1893–1979),  Indian independence activist and wife of Jamnalal Bajaj

See also 
Arora
Khatri

References

Bania communities
Banias
Indian surnames
Surnames of Indian origin
Surnames of Hindustani origin
Punjabi-language surnames
Hindu surnames
Khatri clans
Khatri surnames
Social groups of Rajasthan